Utica is a Buffalo Metro Rail station located at the corner of Main and East Utica Streets.  The station was formerly known at the shortened "Utica" name until December 29, 2021, when it was named as the Robert Traynham Coles Utica Station, named after a deceased architect that worked in the design of the Utica station.

Bus routes
Utica is one of four stations that offers a bus loop, requiring passengers to board/debark using curbside stops (the other three being University, LaSalle and Delavan/Canisius College) and one of only two that has a driveway for bus lines that connect with Metro Rail (the other being Delavan/Canisius College). Route 8 buses heading toward Marine Drive do not board at the curb on the same side as the station, which is served by three bus routes:

Boarding from Bus Loop:
 12 Utica (outbound)
 13 Kensington (outbound)
Boarding on Main Street:
 8 Main
Boarding on East Utica Street:
 12 Utica (inbound)

Artwork
In 1979, an art selection committee was created, composed of NFTA commissioners and Buffalo area art experts, that would judge the artwork that would be displayed in and on the properties of eight stations on the Metro Rail line. Out of the 70 proposals submitted, 22 were chosen and are currently positioned inside and outside of the eight underground stations. Utica is home of three pieces of work, from Margie Hughto (Syracuse), George Smith (Houston) and Craig Langager (New York City). Margie Hughto offers a heavily glazed clay painting covering the interior wall of the concourse level and then descending to the lower level.

Notable places nearby
Utica Station is located near:
 Brylin Hospital
 Cold Spring Bus Garage
 NFTA Transit Police headquarters

George Smith offers a large stainless steel sculpture based on the art and architecture of the Dogon people of Africa. When passing the sculpture, it appears to be in motion. The work of Craig Langager is very easy to recognize on the platforms at train level. His four figures, The Listener (with birds), The Portrait Maker (holding a mirror), The Stagehand (with weights and mask) and The Choreographer-Seneca Man (animal persona), are metal figures paired on either platform.

References

External links
 Video of Utica station's interior

Buffalo Metro Rail stations
Railway stations in the United States opened in 1985
Railway stations located underground in New York (state)
1985 establishments in New York (state)